Zoltán Varga (born July 12, 1970) is a Hungarian chess grandmaster. On the July 2009 FIDE list his Elo rating is 2473.

External links

The chess games of Zoltan Varga

1970 births
Living people
Chess grandmasters
Chess Olympiad competitors
Hungarian chess players
Place of birth missing (living people)
21st-century Hungarian people